Since at least the 19th century, the colors pink and blue have been used as gender signifiers, particularly for infants and young children. The current tradition in the United States (and an unknown number of other countries) is "pink for girls, blue for boys".

Prior to 1940, two conflicting traditions coexisted in the U.S., the current tradition, and its opposite, i.e., "blue for girls, pink for boys". This was noted by Paoletti (1987, 1997, 2012).

Since the 1980s, Paoletti's research has been misinterpreted and has evolved into an urban legend: that there was a full reversal in 1940, prior to which the only tradition observed was the opposite of the current one. Quoting the concluding lines of this study: "In conclusion, there are strong reasons to doubt the validity of the standard PBR [pink-blue reversal] account; if anything, gender-color associations seem to be much more stable than currently believed"

Key to tables 

Year =  year of publication
Location = place to which text pertains
Comments = brief quote from original text

Pink for girls, blue for boys

19th century

20th century

Pink for boys, blue for girls

19th century

20th century

Ambiguous

See also 
 Pink
 Blue
 Baby blue
 Gender
 Gendered associations of pink and blue
 Color code
 Pinkstinks

References 

Gender-related stereotypes
Stereotypes of women
Stereotypes of men
Color in culture
History-related lists
Lists of colors

fr:Rose (couleur)#Le rose féminin